The Korean Metal Workers' Union (KMWU) is a labor union of metal worker in South Korea. The KMWU was founded in February, 2001 as part of the Korean Confederation of Trade Unions.

External links
 

Trade unions in South Korea
Trade unions established in 2001
2001 establishments in South Korea
Organizations based in Seoul
Metal trade unions